C.g.hundi (also known as Channegowdana Hundi) is a small village in H.d.kote Taluk, Mysore district, Karnataka, India, at around 5 acres land. Is located 53 km away from Mysore city and 6 k.m far from H.d.kote. Agriculture is the main occupation in the village. Cotton, sugarcane, Ginger, Banana, turmeric and Vegetables are the main crops in the village.

C.g.hundi  is a small village with a population of around 350 people, with 225 males and 125 females. It has very pretty scenery    with fully of green  land. This village is near to handpost city and h.d.kote taluk. Here we are celebrating two main festivals, During February and March. During February we celebrating dodamma habba with fully grand and fully mutton food festival. In March, we are celebrating maramma habba  for three days. Here we have no problems of drinking water or the power supply or the any facilities to stay with families. Turmeric crop is a very good profiting crop for the village, banana  sugarcane, cotton. And Main thing Here we don't have any Other caste members Only Vokkaliga Gowdas.

References

Villages in Mysore district